Pelucia Bayou is a stream in the U.S. state of Mississippi.

Pelucia  is a name derived from the Choctaw language purported to mean "flying squirrels are there". A variant name is "Palusha Bayou".

References

Rivers of Mississippi
Rivers of Leflore County, Mississippi
Mississippi placenames of Native American origin